Bojnik is a village in the municipality of Novi Grad, Sarajevo, Bosnia and Herzegovina. According to the 2013 census, the village has a population of 399.

Demographics 
According to the 2013 census, its population was 399.

References

Populated places in Novi Grad, Sarajevo